Sergiu P. Pașca (born January 30, 1982) is a Romanian-American scientist and physician at Stanford University in California. Pașca is a Professor of Psychiatry and Behavioral Sciences at Stanford University and the Bonnie Uytengsu and Family Director of Stanford Brain Organogenesis, a neuroscientist and stem cell biologist and currently a New York Stem Cell Foundation Robertson Investigator. He is part of the Stanford Neurosciences Institute, Stanford Bio-X and a fellow of the ChEM-H Institute at Stanford. Pașca was listed among New York Times Visionaries in Medicine and Sciences, and he is the recipient of the 2018 Vilcek Award for Creative Biomedical Promise from the Vlicek Foundation. In 2022, he gave a TED talk on reverse engineering the human brain in the laboratory

Early life and education 

Pașca was born in Cluj-Napoca in the western part of Romania also known as Transylvania. He was raised in nearby Aiud during the last years of communism. Pașca showed early on an interest in chemistry. He set up his first science lab at the age of 11, in the basement of his parents’ house. In the final year of high school, he won a prize in the national chemistry Olympiad, earning a scholarship to attend the university of his choice in Romania. In 2001, Pașca enrolled in the Iuliu Hațieganu University of Medicine and Pharmacy at Cluj-Napoca. As a medical student, he worked with Professor Maria Dronca to explore biochemical defects in autism spectrum disorders. At the same time, he studied electrophysiology at the Max Planck Institute for Brain Research in Frankfurt in Germany under Dr Danko Nikolic. After obtaining his M.D. in 2007, Pașca went to Stanford University in early 2009 as a postdoctoral fellow with Professor Ricardo Dolmetsch. At Stanford, he developed methods to derive neurons from induced pluripotent stem cells (iPSC) and used these neural cultures to identify cellular phenotypes associated with brain disorders, including Timothy syndrome and Dravet syndrome.

Research 

Pașca’s laboratory at Stanford University explores the biological mechanisms of brain disorders using cellular models of the human brain. Pașca developed some of the early in-a-dish models of disease by deriving neurons from skin cells taken from patients with genetic forms of autism and other neurodevelopmental disorders. These patient neurons helped uncover the cellular defects of genetic mutations and demonstrated the promise of this novel technology. In his laboratory, Pașca went further to develop a novel platform that allows to take iPSC from any individuals and engineer lab-grown self-assembling three-dimensional (3D) structures called brain region-specific spheroids or organoids. This method was listed among the Key Advances in hiPSC Disease Modeling of the Last Decade by the journal Cell Stem Cell, and Organoids were named Methods of the Year in 2017 by Nature Methods. These 3D brain tissue resemble specific regions of the nervous system and his laboratory has maintained these cultures for over 800 days in vitro to show maturation of cells, including astrocytes, into postnatal stages. His work on astrocytes was inspired by the late Stanford neurobiologist Ben Barres. Pașca has also demonstrated that brain-region specific organoids can be fused to form brain assembloids and employed this preparation to study the cross-talk between cells in the developing human brain and to mimic human brain circuits in a dish. This work was listed among the Top Research Advances of 2017 by the National Institutes of Health. In 2022, his group demonstrated the successful integration of human cortical organoids into the developing rat cerebral cortex. Human neurons displayed advanced maturation in vivo, responded to whisker stimulation and were capable of influencing the behavior of the rat in a reward task.

Pașca is the co-director of the CSHL Workshop on autism spectrum disorders.

Honors 
Pașca is a New York Stem Cell Foundation Roberston Stem Cell Investigator, a Chan Zuckerberg Initiative Ben Barres Investigator and a CZ BioHub Investigator. His researched activity gained him several awards:

 IBRO Dargut and Milena Kemali International Prize for Basic and Clinical Neurosciences (2022)
 Judson Daland Prize for Outstanding Achievement in Clinical Investigation, American Society of Philosophy (2021)
 Joseph Altman Award in Developmental Neuroscience (2021)
 Schizophrenia Basic Research Award (2021)
 C.J. Herrick Award in Neuroanatomy (2020)
 A.E.Bennett Award, Society of Biological Psychiatry (2018)
 Daniel H. Efron Award, American College of Neuropsychopharmacology (2018)
 Günter Blobel Award, American Society of Cell Biology (2018)
 New York Times Visionaries in Science and Medicine (2018)
 Vilcek Award for Creative Biomedical Promise (2018)
 Jordi Folch-Pi Award, American Society for Neurochemistry (2017)
 NARSAD Independent Investigator Award (2017)
 NIMH Director's BRAINS Award (2015)
 MQ Fellow Award for Transforming Mental Health (2014)
 Sammy Kuo Award (2012)
 IBRO Outstanding Research Fellow (2009)

In Romania, he was recognized as the Best Romanian student studying abroad in 2012.

References 

1982 births
Living people
Scientists from Cluj-Napoca
Romanian emigrants to the United States
Romanian neuroscientists
Stanford University faculty
Iuliu Hațieganu University of Medicine and Pharmacy alumni
People from Aiud